Solapur - Shri Chhatrapati Shahu Maharaj Terminus Kolhapur Superfast Express is a superfast train of the Indian Railways connecting Shri Chhatrapati Shahu Maharaj Terminus, Kolhapur in Maharashtra and Solapur of Maharashtra. It is currently being operated with 22133/22134 train numbers on a daily basis.

Service

The 22133/Solapur - Shri Chhatrapati Shahu Maharaj Terminus Kolhapur Express has an average speed of 56 km/hr and covers 319 km in 5 hrs 40 mins. 22134/Shri Chhatrapati Shahu Maharaj Terminus Kolhapur - Solapur Express has an average speed of 56 km/hr and 319 km in 5 hrs 40 mins.

Route and halts 

The important halts of the train are:

 
 
 Modnimb
 
 Sangola
 Dhalgaon
 Kavathe Mahankal

Coach composite

The train consists of 15 coaches :

 1 AC II Tier
 1 AC III Tier
 7 Sleeper Coaches
 4 General
 2 Second-class Luggage/parcel van

Traction

Both trains are hauled by a Pune Loco Shed based WDM-3A diesel locomotive from Solapur to Kolhapur.

Rake Sharing 

It share its rake with 11303/11304 Manuguru - SCSMT Kolhapur Express.

Direction Reversal

Train Reverses its direction  times:

Notes

External links 

 11051/Solapur - CSMT Kolhapur Express
 11052/CSMT Kolhapur - Solapur Express

References 

Express trains in India
Rail transport in Maharashtra
Transport in Solapur
Transport in Kolhapur
Railway services introduced in 2011